Eupithecia ruficorpus is a moth in the family Geometridae. It is found in India and Nepal.

References

Moths described in 1897
ruficorpus
Moths of Asia